Manmade Sun is the sixth studio album by Primitive Radio Gods, their fourth record released independently through their official website.

Track listing

Notes
"Into the Waiting Car" was previously released as "Normalizer" on the first edition of Still Electric.
"Permission" was titled "When You Whisper" on the initial digital release.

References

Primitive Radio Gods albums
2016 albums